The Best of the Band is the first greatest hits package by Canadian-American rock group the Band. Featuring ten tracks taken from six of their first seven albums (not counting 1974's Before the Flood or 1975's The Basement Tapes, both with Bob Dylan), it featured two tracks from the first, second, third and seventh albums, one each from the fourth and fifth, rounded out by the 1976 single "Twilight".

Record World said that "Twilight" "evokes the spirit of some of the group's finer
moments."

Track listing

Album origin 

An album of the same title was released in UK on the Fame label with different cover and some different tracks.

Notes
The Band's version of the song "The Night They Drove Old Dixie Down" was also featured as part of a promotional-only compilation album released by Capitol Records entitled The Greatest Music Ever Sold (Capitol SPRO-8511/8512), which was distributed to record stores during the 1976 Holiday season as part of Capitol's "Greatest Music Ever Sold" campaign which promoted 15 greatest hits albums issued by the record label.

References

1976 greatest hits albums
Capitol Records compilation albums
The Band compilation albums